The 2022 Seattle Storm season was the franchise's 23rd season in the Women's National Basketball Association. This was the first season back in the newly renovated Climate Pledge Arena.

On June 16, 2022, Sue Bird announced that this season would be her final one and that she would be retiring after the season.

The Storm started the season with an opening day win, but went on to lose their next three games.  They turned their fortunes around after the three game losing streak, and went on a four game winning streak to end the month of May 5–3.  June started with two straight losses, but then the team won four games straight.  They won three of their last five games to finish June 7–4.  They started July strong, losing one of their first six games in the month.  The end of the month saw the team only get two wins out of six games, with five of those six games being on the road.  They finished July 7–5 and clinched a playoff spot on July 30.  The Storm went 3–2 in August, with their only two losses coming to the first place Las Vegas Aces.  They finished the season 22–14, tied for fourth with Washington.  They were awarded the 4th seed based on having a better regular season record vs. Washington.

In their First Round series, the Storm had home court advantage as the fourth seed, and faced off against the fifth seeded Washington Mystics.  The Storm won a close game one 86–83.  They took advantage of their home court and won game two by thirteen points, to sweep the series.  In the Semifinals, they were up against the first seeded Aces.  The Storm won another close game one, 76–73 in Las Vegas.  However, they would go on to lose the next three games and lose the series three games to one.  Most of the games in the series were close, with game two being decided by four points, game three going into overtime, and game four being decided by five points.

Transactions

WNBA Draft

Trades and Roster Changes

Roster

Depth

Schedule

Preseason 

|- style="background:#cfc;"
| 1
| April 23
| Los Angeles
| W 81–68
| Breanna Stewart (20)
| Ezi Magbegor (8)
| Breanna Stewart (4)
| Climate Pledge Arena5,734
| 1–0
|- style="background:#cfc;"
| 2
| April 28
| @ Phoenix
| W 82–78
| Breanna Stewart (16)
| Breanna Stewart (7)
| BirdStewart (4)
| Footprint Center2,759
| 2–0

Regular Season

|- style="background:#cfc;"
| 1
| May 6
| Minnesota
| W 97–74
| LoydStewart (17)
| Breanna Stewart (8)
| Sue Bird (9)
| Climate Pledge Arena 12,904
| 1–0
|- style="background:#fcc;"
| 2
| May 8
| @ Las Vegas
| L 74–85
| Breanna Stewart (21)
| Breanna Stewart (8)
| Sue Bird (7)
| Michelob Ultra Arena6,212
| 1–1
|- style="background:#fcc;"
| 3
| May 11
| @ Phoenix
| L 77–97
| Jewell Loyd (26)
| LavenderLoydMagbegorWilliams (5)
| Sue Bird (6)
| Footprint Center6,098
| 1–2
|- style="background:#fcc;"
| 4
| May 14
| Phoenix
| L 64–69
| Jewell Loyd (26)
| Stephanie Talbot (14)
| BirdLoydTalbot (3)
| Climate Pledge Arena12,453
| 1–3
|- style="background:#cfc;"
| 5
| May 18
| Chicago
| W 74–71
| Ezi Magbegor (21)
| Stephanie Talbot (7)
| Sue Bird (7)
| Climate Pledge Arena7,450
| 2–3
|- style="background:#cfc;"
| 6
| May 20
| Los Angeles
| W 83–80
| Breanna Stewart (28)
| Ezi Magbegor (11)
| Sue Bird (8)
| Climate Pledge Arena10,103
| 3–3
|- style="background:#cfc;"
| 7
| May 27
| New York
| W 79–71
| Breanna Stewart (31)
| LavenderStewartWilliams (9)
| PrinceStewart (4)
| Climate Pledge Arena10,001
| 4–3
|- style="background:#cfc;"
| 8
| May 29
| New York
| W 92–61
| Jewell Loyd (22)
| Jantel Lavender (10)
| Jewell Loyd (6)
| Climate Pledge Arena10,228
| 5–3
|-

|- style="background:#fcc;"
| 9
| June 3
| Dallas
| L 51–68
| Breanna Stewart (27)
| Breanna Stewart (8)
| Briann January (7)
| Climate Pledge Arena8,023
| 5–4
|- style="background:#fcc;"
| 10
| June 5
| Connecticut
| L 86–93
| Ezi Magbegor (19)
| Ezi Magbegor (7)
| Jewell Loyd (7)
| Climate Pledge Arena11,330
| 5–5
|- style="background:#cfc;"
| 11
| June 7
| Atlanta
| W 72–60
| Jewell Loyd (26)
| MagbegorStewart (7)
| Sue Bird (6)
| Climate Pledge Arena7,262
| 6–5
|- style="background:#cfc;"
| 12
| June 10
| @ Dallas
| W 89–88
| Breanna Stewart (32)
| Breanna Stewart (11)
| Gabby Williams (9)
| College Park Center3,292
| 7–5
|- style="background:#cfc;"
| 13
| June 12
| @ Dallas
| W 84–79
| Breanna Stewart (25)
| Breanna Stewart (8)
| Sue Bird (7)
| College Park Center3,273
| 8–5
|- style="background:#cfc;"
| 14
| June 14
| @ Minnesota
| W 81–79
| Breanna Stewart (29)
| Gabby Williams (10)
| Gabby Williams (8)
| Target Center6,031
| 9–5
|- style="background:#fcc;"
| 15
| June 17
| @ Connecticut
| L 71–82
| Breanna Stewart (19)
| Breanna Stewart (7)
| Breanna Stewart (5)
| Mohegan Sun Arena7,088
| 9–6
|- style="background:#cfc;"
| 16
| June 19
| @ New York
| W 81–72
| Gabby Williams (23)
| StewartWilliams (9)
| Jewell Loyd (7)
| Barclays Center6,859
| 10–6
|- style="background:#cfc;"
| 17
| June 23
| Washington
| W 85–71
| Jewell Loyd (22)
| Breanna Stewart (9)
| Sue Bird (8)
| Climate Pledge Arena9,884
| 11–6
|- style="background:#fcc;"
| 18
| June 25
| Los Angeles
| L 77–85
| Breanna Stewart (28)
| Breanna Stewart (7)
| Sue Bird (6)
| Climate Pledge Arena9,955
| 11–7
|- style="background:#cfc;"
| 19
| June 29
| Las Vegas
| W 88–78
| Jewell Loyd (24)
| Ezi Magbegor (8)
| Sue Bird (6)
| Climate Pledge Arena9,499
| 12–7

|- style="background:#cfc;"
| 20
| July 1
| Indiana
| W 73–57
| Breanna Stewart (20)
| Tina Charles (8)
| Jewell Loyd (7)
| Climate Pledge Arena8,565
| 13–7
|- style="background:#fcc;"
| 21
| July 3
| @ Atlanta
| L 76–90
| Breanna Stewart (19)
| Ezi Magbegor (7)
| JanuaryPrince (4)
| Gateway Center Arena3,138
| 13–8
|- style="background:#cfc;"
| 22
| July 5
| @ Indiana
| W 95–73
| Jewell Loyd (25)
| Ezi Magbegor (11)
| Sue Bird (5)
| Indiana Farmers Coliseum2,585
| 14–8
|- style="background:#cfc;"
| 23
| July 7
| @ Los Angeles
| W 106–69
| Breanna Stewart (23)
| Ezi Magbegor (11)
| Jewell Loyd (7)
| Crypto.com Arena6,389
| 15–8
|- style="background:#cfc;"
| 24
| July 12
| Dallas
| W 83–74
| Breanna Stewart (19)
| Tina Charles (9)
| Sue Bird (7)
| Climate Pledge Arena9,486
| 16–8
|- style="background:#cfc;"
| 25
| July 17
| Indiana
| W 81–65
| Breanna Stewart (25)
| StewartWilliams (8)
| Sue Bird (6)
| Climate Pledge Arena9,970
| 17–8
|- style="background:#fcc;"
| 26
| July 20
| @ Chicago
| L 74–78
| Breanna Stewart (24)
| CharlesWilliams (6)
| BirdLoyd (4)
| Wintrust Arena8,893
| 17–9
|- style="background:#fcc;"
| 27
| July 22
| @ Phoenix
| L 78–94
| Breanna Stewart (22)
| Breanna Stewart (14)
| BirdLoydWilliams (5)
| Footprint Center14,162
| 17–10
|- style="background:#cfc;"
| 28
| July 24
| Atlanta
| W 82–72
| Tina Charles (27)
| Tina Charles (15)
| Sue Bird (5)
| Climate Pledge Arena12,654
| 18–10
|- style="background:#fcc;"
| 29
| July 28
| @ Connecticut
| L 83–88
| Breanna Stewart (17)
| Tina Charles (10)
| Sue Bird (7)
| Mohegan Sun Arena9,137
| 18–11
|- style="background:#cfc;"
| 30
| July 30
| @ Washington
| W 82–77
| Breanna Stewart (18)
| Tina Charles (9)
| Sue Bird (7)
| Entertainment and Sports Arena4,200
| 19–11
|- style="background:#fcc;"
| 31
| July 31
| @ Washington
| L 75–78
| Breanna Stewart (23)
| CharlesStewart (5)
| Sue Bird (7)
| Entertainment and Sports Arena4,200
| 19–12
|-

|- style="background:#cfc;"
| 32
| August 3
| Minnesota
| W 89–77
| Breanna Stewart (33)
| Breanna Stewart (8)
| Sue Bird (6)
| Climate Pledge Arena13,500
| 20–12
|- style="background:#fcc;"
| 33
| August 7
| Las Vegas
| L 81–89
| Breanna Stewart (35)
| Breanna Stewart (10)
| BirdG. Williams (6)
| Climate Pledge Arena18,100
| 20–13
|- style="background:#cfc;"
| 34
| August 9
| @ Chicago
| W 111–100
| Breanna Stewart (25)
| Breanna Stewart (9)
| Sue Bird (8)
| Wintrust Arena9,314
| 21–13
|- style="background:#cfc;"
| 35
| August 12
| @ Minnesota
| W 96–69
| Tina Charles (23)
| Breanna Stewart (10)
| Gabby Williams (7)
| Target Center12,134
| 22–13
|- style="background:#fcc;"
| 36
| August 14
| @ Las Vegas
| L 100–109
| Jewell Loyd (38)
| Breanna Stewart (15)
| Sue Bird (7)
| Michelob Ultra Arena10,015
| 22–14
|-

Playoffs 

|- style="background:#cfc;"
| 1
| August 18
| Washington
| W 86–83
| Breanna Stewart (23)
| Breanna Stewart (12)
| Gabby Williams (6)
| Climate Pledge Arena8,917
| 1–0
|- style="background:#cfc;"
| 2
| August 21
| Washington
| W 97–84
| Breanna Stewart (21)
| Breanna Stewart (10)
| Sue Bird (10)
| Climate Pledge Arena12,490
| 2–0

|- style="background:#cfc;"
| 1
| August 28
| @ Las Vegas
| W 76–73
| Jewell Loyd (26)
| Tina Charles (18)
| Sue Bird (12)
| Michelob Ultra Arena9,944
| 1–0
|- style="background:#fcc;"
| 2
| August 31
| @ Las Vegas
| L 73–78
| Breanna Stewart (32)
| Tina Charles (9)
| Sue Bird (6)
| Michelob Ultra Arena9,755
| 1–1
|- style="background:#fcc;"
| 3
| September 4
| Las Vegas
| L 98–110 (OT)
| Breanna Stewart (20)
| Breanna Stewart (15)
| Sue Bird (8)
| Climate Pledge Arena15,431
| 1–2
|- style="background:#fcc;"
| 4
| September 6
| Las Vegas
| L 92–97
| Breanna Stewart (42)
| Tina Charles (9)
| Sue Bird (8)
| Climate Pledge Arena11,328
| 1–3

Standings

Playoffs

Statistics

Regular Season

‡Waived/Released during the season
†Traded during the season
≠Acquired during the season

Playoffs

Awards and Honors

References

External links 
 Official website of the Seattle Storm

Seattle Storm
Seattle Storm seasons
Seattle Storm
Seattle Storm